Tiplersville is an unincorporated community in Tippah County, Mississippi, United States. The zipcode is: 38674.

Notes

Unincorporated communities in Tippah County, Mississippi
Unincorporated communities in Mississippi